DWPA (97.5 FM), broadcasting as El Oro Radyo 97.5, is a radio station owned and operated by the Government of Aroroy. Its studios & transmitter are located along Don Pablo dela Rosa St., Brgy. Poblacion, Aroroy.

References

Radio stations established in 2012